Mark Lyndon Patrick de Vries (born 24 August 1975) is a Dutch football coach and former player. During his playing career he played in Holland, England and Scotland and has since coached in the Faroe Islands and Hungary. After Cambuur, he started working as a coach.

Playing career

Early career 
De Vries was born in Paramaribo, Suriname, but when he was six months old his mother took him to live in Den Helder in the Netherlands. The towering striker played youth football for local side WGW Den Helder. In 1994, De Vries was recruited by FC Volendam where he gained four seasons experience at the top level in the Dutch Eredivisie.

De Vries spent season 1998–99 in the French Second Division with Chamois Niortais and then the Dutch First Division club Dordrecht '90 acquired his services in 1999. In his second season with the club, De Vries scored 11 times and netted 16 times the following season.

Heart of Midlothian 
His services were now in demand and Hearts manager Craig Levein was successful in securing his transfer to the Scottish club in July 2002. De Vries played a massive part in helping Hearts reach the League Cup semi-final in February 2003 and also to secure third place in the Premier League and UEFA Cup football in successive seasons. He scored 29 goals in 72 league matches for the Edinburgh club. He is well remembered by Hearts fans for scoring 4 goals on his first start against fierce city rivals Hibernian in a 5–1 victory in August 2002.

On 6 November 2003, de Vries scored the winning goal which gave Hearts a shock victory over Bordeaux, producing one of the club's best ever away results in European competition. Hearts rejected an offer from QPR for de Vries on 21 December 2004, while Sheffield United and Plymouth Argyle all expressed an interest to sign the striker after his fine performances in the UEFA Cup.

Leicester City 
De Vries joined Leicester City on 6 January 2005 – joining Craig Levein at his new club, and becoming his first signing, alongside fellow former Hearts player Alan Maybury. Upon signing for City, de Vries said,

The striker made his debut for the Foxes in their 2–2 FA Cup third round draw with Blackpool at the Walkers Stadium on 8 January 2005. De Vries made 20 appearances for the Foxes that season, scoring his first goal for the club in a 3–1 defeat of Millwall, a goal which was to prove his only one of the season. He was employed as a lone striker in the FA Cup fifth round clash against Charlton Athletic on 19 February 2005, and was instrumental in City's progress to the quarter finals as they won 2–1.

In the first half of the 2005–06 season, he scored 9 goals, including the winning goal against Tottenham Hotspur in the FA Cup. In a League Cup match against Blackpool on 20 September 2005, de Vries was made captain as he scored two goals for Leicester.

After playing 35 matches for struggling Leicester in the season up to the end of January, de Vries left the club on a loan deal to Dutch club SC Heerenveen, following the dismissal of Levein, who was replaced by Rob Kelly. De Vries rejected a permanent move to Heerenveen in the summer, instead joining fellow Eredivisie side ADO Den Haag on loan for the 2006–07 season. He only scored two goals in 27 appearances as the Dutch team were relegated to the Eerste Divisie.

On 7 June 2007, de Vries was placed on the transfer list alongside Rab Douglas. Despite this, he remained in the first team for the start of the 2007–08 season, scoring his last goal for Leicester in a 4–1 home win over Watford on 25 August. He made his last contribution for the club in a 3–2 away win over Nottingham Forest in a League Cup match on 18 September, assisting the winning goal.

On 1 October 2007, De Vries joined Leeds United on loan for an initial one-month period, where he provided cover for Jermaine Beckford and Tresor Kandol. He made his debut against Oldham Athletic on 2 October 2007, scoring his first goal for the club against Yeovil on 6 October 2007. On 25 October, Leeds terminated de Vries' loan contract after he suffered a broken toe. He made a total of four appearances for the club, scoring one goal. However, on 12 November 2007 he rejoined Leeds on until 15 January. His time at Leicester finally came to an end when he was released by mutual consent on 25 January 2008.

Dundee United 
De Vries joined Dundee United on the same day he was released from Leicester City, for the third time linking up with Craig Levein who had signed him while at Leicester just under three years ago and Hearts before that. De Vries scored his first goal for United in the League Cup final defeat against Rangers and netted his first league goal six days later in the win against Motherwell. De Vries's contract expired at the end of June 2008 and he undertook a trial with Dutch side SC Cambuur in late July.

Cambuur Leeuwarden 
De Vries joined SC Cambuur Leeuwarden on 28 August 2008. He scored on his debut against FC Emmen, a game that Cambuur won 6–2, scoring the final goal of the match. He signed a two-year contract with the club, who are favorites to win the league and to move up to the Eredivisie.
Mark de Vries is, as a "pinch-hitter", very important for SC Cambuur, in last seasons playoffs he scored two important, winning, goals against FC Zwolle and the 1–1 in the away game against Roda JC, gaining a third and decisive game in the playoffs against that team (Roda JC) which SC Cambuur lost.
Also in 2011 in playoffs he scored all three goal of SC Cambuur, but SC Cambuur could not qualify due to a last-minute equaliser by Zwolle, who passed at penalties. In 2010 De Vries was voted player of the year in the Dutch Jupiler League.

Managerial career
After leaving Cambuur, de Vries played for ONS Sneek before returning to Den Helder to play and coach. He has since worked in the Faroe Islands for TB/FC Suðuroy/Royn and in Hungary for Budapest Honvéd.

Honours

Club
Dundee United
Scottish League Cup runner-up: 2007–08

Individual
Scottish Premier League Player of the Month: September 2002

References

External links
 
 Profile at * londonhearts.com

1975 births
Living people
Surinamese emigrants to the Netherlands
Sportspeople from Paramaribo
Association football forwards
Dutch footballers
Leeds United F.C. players
Leicester City F.C. players
Heart of Midlothian F.C. players
Dundee United F.C. players
FC Volendam players
Chamois Niortais F.C. players
FC Dordrecht players
SC Heerenveen players
ADO Den Haag players
SC Cambuur players
Eredivisie players
Eerste Divisie players
English Football League players
Scottish Premier League players
People from Den Helder
Expatriate footballers in Scotland
Expatriate footballers in England
Dutch expatriate footballers
ONS Sneek players